The United States Virgin Islands competed at the 1976 Summer Olympics in Montreal, Quebec, Canada.

Athletics

Men
Track & road events

Women
Track & road events

Boxing

Men

Sailing

Open

Shooting

Open

Swimming

Men

Women

Wrestling

Men's freestyle

References
Official Olympic Reports

Nations at the 1976 Summer Olympics
1976 Summer Olympics
1976 in the United States Virgin Islands
1976 in United States Virgin Islands sports